Armstrong House is a historic home located at Ripley, Jackson County, West Virginia. It was built about 1848, and is a two-story brick rectangle with a two-story ell (modified
"T") in the Greek Revival style. It is the oldest house in Ripley.

It was listed on the National Register of Historic Places in 1980.

References

Houses on the National Register of Historic Places in West Virginia
Greek Revival houses in West Virginia
Houses completed in 1848
Houses in Jackson County, West Virginia
National Register of Historic Places in Jackson County, West Virginia